Halglar Dostlugu is a Baku Metro station. It was opened on 28 April 1989.

See also
List of Baku metro stations

References

Baku Metro stations
Railway stations opened in 1989
1989 establishments in Azerbaijan